James Allen Mangold (born December 16, 1963) is an American filmmaker. He is best known for the films Cop Land (1997), Girl, Interrupted (1999), Walk the Line (2005), 3:10 to Yuma (2007), The Wolverine (2013) and Logan (2017), the last of which earned him a nomination for the Academy Award for Best Adapted Screenplay. He then directed and produced the sports drama film Ford v Ferrari (2019), which earned him a nomination for the Academy Award for Best Picture. He also directed and co-wrote the 2023 film Indiana Jones and the Dial of Destiny.

Early life
Mangold was born in New York City in 1963, and is the son of Jewish artists Robert Mangold and Sylvia Plimack Mangold. He was raised in Hudson Valley and graduated from Washingtonville High School.

He attended the California Institute of the Arts film/video program where he studied under Alexander Mackendrick. During Mangold's third year, Mackendrick suggested that he should study at CalArts School of Theater as an actor, alongside his regular film studies.

Career
In 1985, Mangold secured a writer/director deal at Disney. He wrote a television movie and co-wrote the animated feature Oliver and Company. A few years later, Mangold moved to New York and applied to Columbia University's film school, where he graduated with an MFA in film. While there, he studied under film director Miloš Forman who helped him develop the scripts for Heavy and Cop Land.

He has worked as a feature writer and director since 1995, when his first feature, the independent film Heavy, won the best directing prize at the Sundance Film Festival.

Mangold subsequently wrote and directed Cop Land (1997), starring Sylvester Stallone, Robert De Niro, Harvey Keitel, and Ray Liotta; Girl, Interrupted, which won the Best Supporting Actress Oscar in 1999 for Angelina Jolie; Kate & Leopold, starring Meg Ryan and Hugh Jackman, for which Jackman was nominated for a Golden Globe as best actor in a musical or comedy in 2001, and the 2003 thriller Identity which starred John Cusack.

In 2005, Mangold co-wrote (with Gill Dennis), produced (under his production banner, Tree Line Film), and directed Walk the Line, a film about the young life of singer-songwriter Johnny Cash and his relationship with June Carter Cash. Starring Joaquin Phoenix and Reese Witherspoon, it was released on November 18, 2005, to positive reviews and grossed $187 million worldwide. It was nominated for five Oscars and Witherspoon won Best Actress for her performance as June Carter Cash.

Mangold also appeared as an actor in The Sweetest Thing as a doctor and love interest to Christina Applegate as well as in his own Kate & Leopold playing a movie director.

In 2007, Mangold directed a Western remake, 3:10 to Yuma, starring Russell Crowe and Christian Bale; it received positive reviews and grossed around $71 million worldwide.

In June 2011, Mangold was hired, initially just to direct the X-Men movie The Wolverine. Along with screenwriters Christopher McQuarrie, Scott Frank and Mark Bomback, Mangold also adapted the screenplay based upon Frank Miller and Chris Claremont's Japanese Wolverine saga and entered production in Japan and Australia in July 2012. He completed photography in November of the same year. On release, it was a box office success, ending up with a worldwide gross of $414,828,246 with a budget of $120 million, according to Box Office Mojo.

Following the box office success and moderate critical response to The Wolverine, Mangold signed on to write the story and direct the sequel, Logan (2017). The film marked Mangold and Jackman's third collaboration. Scott Frank was hired to return as co-screenwriter, working as a team with Mangold and Michael Green. The development of the film was lengthy, with Jackman citing his and Mangold's desire to do the character justice for his last time in the role. The film incorporated elements from Mark Millar's Old Man Logan run on the comics. Mangold has stated that the plot primarily focuses on character development, rather than superhero spectacle. Logan was a commercial success, and received high praise for its gritty approach on the titular character and emotional depth. Often called one of the greatest superhero films of all time, the movie also earned an Academy Award nomination for Best Adapted Screenplay, becoming the first live-action superhero movie to be nominated for Adapted Screenplay, as well as Mangold's first Oscar nomination.

In February 2018, it was announced that Mangold was set to direct a film about the 1966 24 Hours of Le Mans, with Christian Bale and Matt Damon starring as Ken Miles and Carroll Shelby respectively, and Jez Butterworth, John-Henry Butterworth and Jason Keller writing the script. The film, titled Ford v Ferrari, was released in November 2019 to critical acclaim and became a box office success, grossing $225 million worldwide. The film received 4 nominations including Best Picture, with two wins for Best Film Editing and Best Sound Editing at the 92nd Academy Awards.

In February 2020, it was announced that Mangold was in talks to direct the then untitled fifth film in the Indiana Jones franchise, later revealed to be titled Indiana Jones and the Dial of Destiny, taking over for Steven Spielberg, who directed the first four films in the franchise and will now instead act as producer. In May 2020, it was officially confirmed that Mangold will serve as director. Filming began in the United Kingdom in June 2021, and wrapped in February 2022. The film is expected to be released on June 30, 2023.

Mangold was announced in early 2020 to direct the Bob Dylan biopic A Complete Unknown, starring Timothée Chalamet. Despite production delays due to the COVID-19 pandemic and Mangold committing to Indiana Jones, Chalamet told Variety in November 2022 that he was still preparing for the role and that "the winds that are blowing are blowing in a very positive direction". In early 2022, Mangold was similarly announced to be directing a Buster Keaton biopic for 20th Century Studios based on Marion Meade's Buster Keaton: Cut to the Chase, for which executives had been looking for writers to adapt the book into a script for Mangold to direct. In February 2023, Mangold was reported by The Hollywood Reporter to be in early talks to direct a film based on the Swamp Thing, as part of James Gunn's and Peter Safran's newly-announced "Chapter One: Gods and Monsters" film slate for the DC Universe, after the releases of his Indiana Jones film and Bob Dylan biopic.

Favorite films
In 2002, Mangold participated in the Sight & Sound film polls of that year. Held every ten years to select the greatest films of all time, contemporary directors were asked to select ten films of their choice. Mangold, however, picked 11, which are listed below:

 8½ (Italy, 1963)
 The Palm Beach Story (USA, 1942)
 The Verdict (USA, 1982)
 Sweet Smell of Success (USA, 1957)
 The Apartment (USA, 1960)
 Shadow of a Doubt (USA, 1943)
 Umberto D. (Italy, 1952)
 Black Narcissus (UK, 1947)
 Great Expectations (UK, 1946)
 Floating Weeds (Japan, 1959)
 Sherlock Jr. (USA, 1924)

Filmography

Film

Writer only
 Oliver & Company (1988)

Producer only
 Lift (2001)
 The Call of the Wild (2020)

Executive producer only
 The Greatest Showman (2017)

Acting roles

Television 

Writer

Consulting producer
 City on a Hill (2019-)

Awards and nominations

Directed Academy Award performances

Mangold has directed multiple Academy Award-winning and nominated performances.

References

External links 

James Mangold on Rotten Tomatoes

American male screenwriters
California Institute of the Arts alumni
Film directors from New York City
Living people
Writers from New York City
People from Washingtonville, New York
Columbia University School of the Arts alumni
Action film directors
1963 births
Screenwriters from New York (state)
Film producers from New York (state)
American male television writers
American television directors
American film directors
American film producers